is a Japanese pop singer and model. She is a former member of the Japanese pop group Morning Musume. She joined in late 2003 as a sixth generation member along with Miki Fujimoto, Sayumi Michishige, and Reina Tanaka. She graduated on December 15, 2010, in Yokohama Arena along with Junjun and Linlin.

Career

Kamei was born in Arakawa, Tokyo. She was selected from the Morning Musume Love Audition 2002 to join Morning Musume as a member of the sixth generation. She first appeared on the single "Shabondama" and her first album was Ai no Dai 6 Kan.

Towards late 2004, Kamei is thought to have opened up after receiving her own segment on the Japanese variety show Hello! Morning, where she had been a regular since her debut. Project. Her segment was removed from the show in the winter of 2005, but she still stars in the rest of the show as a regular.

In 2004, Kamei appeared in the 2004 Hello! Project shuffle units unit H.P. All Stars. She was also involved in Morning Musume Sakuragumi when Morning Musume was split into two groups.

In 2009, Kamei was put in the group Tanpopo as the fourth generation along with fellow Morning Musume member Aika Mitsui, Berryz Kobo member Yurina Kumai and Cute member Chisato Okai.

On August 8, 2010, Kamei's graduation from Hello! Project was announced by Tsunku on his blog and at that day's Hello! Project concert. Along with Junjun and Linlin they graduated at the end of Morning Musume's 2010 Fall Concert. Kamei performed Haru Beautiful Everyday as her graduation song.

Works

Photobooks 

† An exclusive digital version of this photobook was also released for cell phone users. Entitled Jungle, and retailing for 525 yen, it was released on February 19, 2007. A second batch of photographs was made available on February 21.

DVDs

Acts

Movies

Musicals 
 
  – As Stepsister Portia

Television shows

Radio

References 

1988 births
21st-century Japanese women singers
21st-century Japanese singers
Japanese women pop singers
Japanese child singers
Japanese female idols
Living people
Morning Musume members
Japanese television personalities
People from Arakawa, Tokyo
Tanpopo members
Singers from Tokyo